The Transhumanist Party is a political party in the United States. The party's platform is based on the ideas and principles of transhumanist politics, e.g., human enhancement, human rights, science, life extension, and technological progress.

History 
The Transhumanist Party was founded in 2014 by Zoltan Istvan. Istvan became the first political candidate to run for office under the banner of the Transhumanist Party when he announced his candidacy for President of the United States in the United States presidential election of 2016. As part of his campaign Zoltan and a cadre of transhumanist activists and embedded journalists embarked on a four-month journey in the coffin-shaped Immortality Bus, which traveled on a winding cross-country route from San Francisco to Washington D.C. The Transhumanist Party has been featured or mentioned in many major media sites, including the National Review, Business Insider, Extreme Tech, Vice, Wired, The Telegraph, The Huffington Post, The Joe Rogan Experience, Heise Online, Gizmodo, and Reason. Political scientist Roland Benedikter said the formation of the Transhumanist Party in the USA was one of three reasons transhumanism entered into the mainstream in 2014, creating "a new level of public visibility and potential impact."

November 2016–2018 
Following the end of the 2016 presidential election, after Zoltan's 2016 presidential campaign was completed, Gennady Stolyarov II became the Chairman of the party and the organisation was restructured. Under Chairman Stolyarov, the party adopted a new Constitution, which included three immutable Core Ideals in Article I, Section I:

New positions were founded, including Pavel Ilin became Secretary, Dinorah Delfin Director of Admissions and Public Relations, Arin Vahanian as Director of Marketing, Sean Singh as Director of Applied Innovation, Brent Reitze as Director of Publication, Franco Cortese as Director of Scholarship, and B.J. Murphy as Director of Social Media. Restructured advisor positions included Zoltan Istvan as Political and Media Advisor, Bill Andrews as Biotechnology Advisor, Jose Cordeiro as Technology Advisor, Newton Lee as Education and Media Advisor, Keith Comito as Crowdfunding Advisor, Aubrey de Grey as Anti-Aging Advisor, Rich Lee as Biohacking Advisor, Katie King as Media Advisor, Ira Pastor as Regeneration Advisor, Giovanni Santostasi as Regeneration Advisor, Elizabeth Parrish as Advocacy Advisor, and Paul Spiegel as Legal Advisor.

The U.S. Transhumanist Party held six Platform votes during January, February, March, May, June, and November 2017, on the basis of which 82 Platform planks were adopted. The U.S. Transhumanist Party holds votes of its members electronically and is the first political party in the United States to use ranked-preference voting method with instant runoffs in its internal ballots.

In May 2018 the New York Times reported the U.S. Transhumanist Party as having 880 members. On July 7, 2018, the U.S. Transhumanist Party reached 1,000 members and released a demographic analysis of its membership. This analysis showed that 704 members, or 70.4%, were eligible to vote in the United States, whereas 296 or 29.6% were allied members.

During this time, the Transhumanist Party hosted several expert discussion panels, on subjects including artificial intelligence, life extension, art and transhumanism, and cryptocurrencies. Chairman Stolyarov has also hosted in-person Enlightenment Salons, which were aimed at cross-disciplinary discussion of transhumanist and life-extensionist ideas under the auspices of the U.S. Transhumanist Party.

On August 11, 2017, at the  Fest 2017 conference in San Diego, California, Chairman Stolyarov gave an address entitled "The U.S. Transhumanist Party: Pursuing a Peaceful Political Revolution for Longevity", which provided an overview of the U.S. Transhumanist Party's key principles and objectives. In October 2017 Hank Pellissier founded the "Transhuman Party" following a trademark dispute with Zoltan Istvan's continued ownership of the 'Transhumanist Party' trademark. In response to Pellissier, the U.S. Transhumanist Party published its FAQ, where a significant portion was devoted to explaining the history of the U.S. Transhumanist Party, its current interactions with Zoltan Istvan and the scope of his involvement, and the reasons for his continued ownership of the 'Transhumanist Party' trademark. The Transhuman Party became defunct in late 2017 due to lack of activity and its domain name and Facebook page were acquired by the US Transhumanist Party.

By September 2017 the Party had appointed a number of international ambassadors, from Brazil, Bulgaria, Canada, Chile, Egypt, England, Hong Kong, India, Nigeria, and Scotland. On November 9, 2017, in a virtual presentation at the TransVision 2017 conference in Brussels, Belgium, Chairman Stolyarov gave an overview of the U.S. Transhumanist Party's achievements in 2017 and future aspirations.  On March 31, 2018, Chairman Stolyarov was interviewed by Nikola Danaylov, a.k.a. Socrates, of Singularity.FM during a three-hour session, the longest of all of Danaylov's interviews.

2020 presidential campaign
The Transhumanist Party presidential primary attracted media attention from BioEdge and the Milwaukee Record. While some media outlets reported Zoltan Istvan was considering running again, ultimately he did not join the party's primary. After a protracted primary process with nine candidates, featuring numerous debates, Johannon Ben Zion was elected as the party's nominee. After winning the primary, Ben Zion gave his acceptance speech at RAAD Fest 2019 in Las Vegas. and filed with the FEC. Shortly thereafter, film producer, entrepreneur, and longevity organizer Charlie Kam became Ben Zion's running mate. On October 19, 2019, Ben Zion spoke to the DC Transhumanists meetup in Arlington, VA. On November 3, 2019, he spoke at the Foresight Institute's Vision Weekend Event in San Francisco. On November 24, 2019, he spoke to undergraduates at Princeton University as part of the Princeton Envision conference. On March 4, 2020, Ben Zion participated in the Free & Equal Elections Foundation's Open Presidential debate in Chicago, Illinois. Zoltan Istvan also participated in the debate, running as a Republican.

On June 12, 2020, it was announced that Ben Zion had left the Transhumanist Party, with him declaring that his belief in Techno-progressivism was incompatible with the party, and that he would instead be pursuing a run for the Reform Party nomination. Kam was declared the replacement presidential nominee. In June 2020 Charlie Kam participated in a panel with London Futurists and in July 2020 his campaign received press coverage in the Daily Express. On August 21, 2020, Kam announced his selection of Elizabeth (Liz) Parrish as his vice-presidential running mate.

A few days after his departure from the party, Ben Zion published a video purporting to show him eating a cellular culture of his own skin cells which reportedly were grown in the lab of a startup he is affiliated with, Quixotic Life Sciences. In a statement disavowing the stunt published on the USTP website, it was noted that USTP officers “previously warned Ben Zion that he would be disavowed if he pursued this reckless project.”

Platform
A core tenet of the  platform is that more funding is needed for research into human life extension research and research to reduce existential risk. More generally, the goal is to raise awareness among the general public about how technologies can enhance the human species. Democratic transhumanists and libertarian transhumanists tend to be in disagreement over the role of government in society, but both agree that laws should not encumber technological human progress.

The Transhumanist Party platform promotes national and global prosperity by sharing technologies and creating enterprises to lift people and nations out of poverty, war, and injustice. The Transhumanist Party also supports LGBT rights, drug legalization, and sex work legalization. The party seeks to fully subsidize university-level education while also working to "create a cultural mindset in America that embracing and producing radical technology and science is in the best interest of our nation and species."

In terms of foreign policy and national defense, the party wants to reduce the amount of money spent on foreign wars and use the money domestically. The party also advocates managing and preparing for existential risks, eliminating dangerous diseases, and proactively guarding against abuses of technology, such as nanotechnology, synthetic viruses, and artificial intelligence.

The USTP expressly supports the rights of Artificial General Intelligence entities that are sentient and/or lucid. The Transhumanist Bill of Rights Version 3.0 recognizes 7 levels of sentience, and requires entities to exist at level 5 or higher to be considered as having rights. At level 5, the main criterion is that the entity be "lucid", meaning the entity is "meta-aware", or aware of its own awareness.

The various policy points of the US Transhumanist Party's platform have attracted both praise and criticism from sociologist Steve Fuller. For example, Fuller has praised the centrality of morphological freedom in the US Transhumanist Party's bill of rights, but on the other hand he has also written that the party is too critical of the US Department of Defense, which he argues could be an ally for some transhumanist initiatives such as human enhancement and existential risk reduction. In 2018 the party as a whole was reviewed favorably as an example of a successful "niche" party by Krisztian Szabados, a director at the Edmond J. Safra Center for Ethics at Harvard University.

State parties

International analogs

The Transhumanist Party in Europe is the umbrella organization that supports the national level transhumanist parties in Europe by developing unified policies and goals for the continent.  Among them is the UK Transhumanist Party, which was founded in January 2015. In October 2015, Amon Twyman, the party's leader at the time, published a blog post distancing the UK party from Zoltan Istvan's campaign.

References

External links
  US Transhumanist Party – Official Website
 Ben Zion 2020 Official Campaign Website
 US Transhumanist Party – Historic website

Transhumanist organizations
Transhumanist politics
Life extension organizations
Political parties established in 2014
Political parties in the United States